Sixten Ivar Alexander Ringbom (July 27, 1935 – August 18, 1992) was a Finnish art historian.

Biography 

He studied at the Swedish classical lyceum in Turku, then at the Åbo Akademi University among students of his father. In 1965, Sixten received his PhD. A supervisor his doctoral thesis was art historian Ernst Gombrich. In 1970, Ringbom succeeded his father as professor of art history at Åbo Akademi University.

Ringbom became the first scientist who has supposed an existence of a connection between early abstract art and occultism. He published his conjectures in an article "Art in 'The Epoch of the Great Spiritual': Occult Elements in the Early Theory of Abstract Painting" (1966) and in a book The Sounding Cosmos: A Study in the Spiritualism of Kandinsky and the Genesis of Abstract Painting (1970). According to WorldCat, he had written 93 works. From 1969 to 1973, he was the chief editor of Finsk Tidskrift, he was also the editor of a book Konsten i Finland [Art in Finland].

Published works

Books 
 Icon to Narrative. The Rise of the Dramatic Close-Up in Fifteenth-Century Devotional Painting (1965)
 The Sounding Cosmos. A Study in the Spiritualism of Kandinsky and the Genesis of Abstract Painting (1970)
 Konsten i Finland: från medeltid till nutid (1978)
 Kandinsky und 'Der Blaue Reiter'. German Art of the 20th Century (1985)
 Art History in Finland before 1920 (1986)
 Stone, Style and Truth. The Vogue for Natural Stone in Nordic Architecture 1880−1910 (1987)
 Pinta ja syvyys: esseitä (1989)

Selected articles 
 "'Maria in Sole' and the Virgin of the Rosary" (1962)
 "Plato on Images" (1965)
 "Art in 'The Epoch of the Great Spiritual': Occult Elements in the Early Theory of Abstract Painting" (1966)
 "Devotional Images and Imaginative Devotions" (1969)
 "Paul Klee and the Inner Truth to Nature" (1977)
 "Transcending the Visible" (1985)
 "Action and Report. The Problem of Indirect Narration in the Academic Theory of Painting" (1988)

See also 
 Theosophy and visual arts

Notes

References

Sources 

 
 
 
 
 
 

1935 births
1992 deaths
Finnish art historians
Writers from Turku
Åbo Akademi University alumni
Academic staff of Åbo Akademi University
20th-century Finnish historians